Melanoptilia is a genus of moths in the family Pterophoridae described by Cees Gielis in 2006. All described species come from Latin America.

Species
Melanoptilia arsenica (Meyrick, 1921)
Melanoptilia nigra Gielis, 2006
Melanoptilia chalcogastra (Meyrick, 1921)
Melanoptilia haemogastra (Meyrick, 1926)

References

Platyptiliini
Moth genera